Harryhausen: The Lost Movies is a book by John Walsh (one of the trustees of the Ray and Diana Harryhausen Foundation, one of the largest animation archives of its kind) published September 10, 2019. This is a guide to unrealised cinema films of Ray Harryhausen from 1940s to the 2000s.

Overview

Animation Magazine said the “This off-screen side of an incredible career is brought to life with never-before-seen artwork, sketches, photos and test footage from the Foundation’s archives.”

Recognition
Screen Anarchy chose Harryhausen: The Lost Movies as one of their top ten books of 2019. In 2020 the book was nominated as Book for the Year for the Rondo Hatton Classic Horror Awards.

Publication
Published in September 2019 by Titan Books.

References

Further reading

External links
 Ray Harryhausen Foundation

2019 non-fiction books
Books about film directors
History of film
Animation books
History of animation
Coffee table books
Works about Ray Harryhausen
Titan Books titles